George W. Nebinger Elementary School is a K–8 school located in the Bella Vista neighborhood of Philadelphia, Pennsylvania. It is a part of the School District of Philadelphia.

Its historic school building was designed by Irwin T. Catharine and built in 1924–1925. It is a four-story, nine bay, brick building on a raised basement in the Art Deco-style. The entrance portico features Doric order columns, and at the roofline is a brick parapet. It was added to the National Register of Historic Places in 1988.

History
The School District of Philadelphia ended summer school, except for students who need to earn credits to receive high school diplomas, in 2012 due to budget cuts. As a result, Nebinger principal Ralph Burnley and Leslie Patterson-Tyler, the wife of the reverend of the Mother Bethel A.M.E. Church, established their own summer school program serving students from Nebinger and other area schools. It was financed by members of the church and the Queen Village Neighborhood Association.

Demographics
In 2012 85% of Nebinger's student body was considered economically disadvantaged. That year Kristen A. Graham of the Philadelphia Inquirer wrote that compared to the William M. Meredith School in Queen Village and the George A. McCall School in Society Hill, Nebinger "struggles more".

Feeder patterns
Neighborhoods assigned to Nebinger are also assigned to Furness High School.

Gallery

References

Further reading
 Nicholas, Peter. "Clinton Checks In On Americorps 2 Volunteers At Nebinger School Get Feedback Right From The Top." (Archive). Philadelphia Inquirer. April 29, 1997.

External links

 George W. Nebinger School
 
 Friends of Nebinger – Queen Village Neighbors Association

School buildings on the National Register of Historic Places in Philadelphia
Art Deco architecture in Pennsylvania
School buildings completed in 1925
South Philadelphia
Public K–8 schools in Philadelphia
School District of Philadelphia
1925 establishments in Pennsylvania